The 2015 LPGA Tour was a series of professional golf tournaments for elite female golfers from around the world. The Tour began in Ocala, Florida on January 28 and ended on November 22 at the Gold Course of the Tiburón Golf Club in Naples, Florida. The tournaments were sanctioned by the United States-based Ladies Professional Golf Association (LPGA).

Lydia Ko won five tournaments, including one major, led the money list, won the Race to the CME Globe, and became the youngest winner of the LPGA Tour's Player of the Year award. Inbee Park also won five tournaments, including two majors, and won the Vare Trophy for the lowest scoring average. She also accumulated enough points to be inducted into the LPGA Hall of Fame upon her completion of her 10th year on tour (2016). Sei-Young Kim won three tournaments and the Rookie of the Year award.

Schedule and results
The number in parentheses after each winners' name is the player's total number of wins in official money individual events on the LPGA Tour, including that event. Tournament and winner names in bold indicate LPGA majors.

^ Kingsmill Championship finished on Monday May 18 due to a rain-delay.

Season leaders
Money list leaders

Full 2015 Official Money List

Scoring average leaders

Full 2015 Scoring Average List

Awards

See also
2015 Ladies European Tour
2015 Symetra Tour

References

External links
Official site

LPGA Tour seasons
LPGA Tour